= Skitt Mountain =

Mountain in Georgia, United States

Coordinates: 34.5051°N 83.7223°W

Skitt Mountain is a summit in the U.S. state of Georgia. The elevation is 2,076 feet (632 meters).

The mountain's name is supposedly derived from the word "skit", on account of the tall tales or skits, told there by miners.
